The 1995 NFL draft was the procedure by which National Football League teams selected amateur college football players. It is officially known as the NFL Annual Player Selection Meeting. The draft was held April 22–23, 1995 at the Paramount Theatre at Madison Square Garden in New York City, New York. The league also held a supplemental draft after the regular draft and before the regular season.

The draft was the first with the expansion Carolina Panthers and Jacksonville Jaguars franchises, who each received two extra picks between the first and second rounds. The Panthers, having selected second in the 1995 NFL Expansion Draft, were awarded the first overall pick in the main draft and the Jaguars, who held the first pick in the expansion draft, selected second. However, the Panthers traded their number one pick to the Cincinnati Bengals for the Bengals' fifth overall pick and their fourth pick in the second round. The Bengals used the selection on Ki-Jana Carter, who is the most recent running back taken first overall. The Panthers were also stripped of two supplemental picks for improperly recruiting Pittsburgh Steelers defensive coordinator Dom Capers as their head coach.

In the first round, the Tampa Bay Buccaneers selected future Hall of Fame players Warren Sapp and Derrick Brooks. This was the second of three times two Hall of Fame inductees were selected by the same team in the first round, along with the Chicago Bears in 1965 and the Baltimore Ravens in the following year's draft. Although Sapp was projected to be a top 10 pick, he slid to the 12th selection due to allegations of failed drug tests. He and Brooks would go on to lead the Tampa 2 defense that brought the Buccaneers to their first Super Bowl title in Super Bowl XXXVII.

The draft was also the last to feature a team based in Los Angeles until 2016 due to the Los Angeles Raiders returning to Oakland later in the year.

Player selections

Supplemental draft

Trades
In the explanations below, (D) denotes trades that took place during the 1994 Draft, while (PD) indicates trades completed pre-draft.

Round one

Round two

Round three

Round four

Round five

Round six

Round seven

Notable undrafted players

Hall of Famers
 Curtis Martin, running back from University of Pittsburgh, taken 3rd round, 74th overall by the New England Patriots.
Inducted: Professional Football Hall of Fame class of 2012.
 Warren Sapp, defensive tackle from University of Miami (FL), taken 1st round, 12th overall by the Tampa Bay Buccaneers.
Inducted: Professional Football Hall of Fame class of 2013.
 Derrick Brooks, linebacker from Florida State University, taken 1st round, 28th overall by the Tampa Bay Buccaneers.
Inducted: Professional Football Hall of Fame class of 2014.
 Terrell Davis, running back from University of Georgia, taken 6th round, 196th overall by the Denver Broncos.
Inducted: Professional Football Hall of Fame class of 2017.
 Ty Law, defensive back from University of Michigan, taken 1st round, 23rd overall by the New England Patriots.
Inducted: Professional Football Hall of Fame class of 2019.
 Tony Boselli, offensive tackle from University of Southern California, taken 1st round, 2nd overall by the Jacksonville Jaguars.
Inducted: Professional Football Hall of Fame class of 2022.

Notes

References
General references
 

Specific references

External links
 NFL.com – 1995 Draft
 databaseFootball.com – 1995 Draft

National Football League Draft
NFL Draft
Draft
NFL Draft
NFL Draft
American football in New York City
1990s in Manhattan
Sporting events in New York City
Madison Square Garden